Headlines is a 2001 Hong Kong comedy-drama film directed by Leo Heung and starring Emil Chau, Maggie Cheung Ho-yee, Daniel Wu,  and Wayne Lai. This film revolves around the Hong Kong press.

Plot
Headlines tells the story of three reporters. Peter Wong (Daniel Wu), make his best efforts to overcome his lack of experience, he tracks down a story involving a young girl (Grace Yip) who is raising her two brothers on her own... Joey (Maggie Cheung) willing to overcome the difficulties of her job, end up she gets involved with a young triad Ho Wai-keung (Oscar Leung) while trying to write a story about him... Sorrow Chan (Emil Chau), a veteran reporter  investigates a jewel robbery that involves one of his policeman friends, officer Mak Chun-hang (Wayne Lai)... The three reporters encounter situations which cause them to reevaluate their professions.

Cast and roles
Emil Chau as Sorrow Chan
Maggie Cheung Ho-yee as Joey
Daniel Wu as Peter Wong
 as Yuen Chi-wai
Wayne Lai as Officer Mak Chun-hang
Oscar Leung as Ho Wai-keung
Simon Lui as Yang
Rainbow Ching as Miss Wong
Benny Li as Ben Wong
Lee Wai-kei as Kwok
David Lam as Elvis Mok
Michael Tsui as Ricky Chan
Eddie Chan as Mr. Light
Hui Fan as Keung's granny
Tam Kon-chung as Bodyguard

References

External links

Headlines at Hong Kong Cinemagic

2001 films
2001 comedy-drama films
Hong Kong comedy-drama films
2000s Cantonese-language films
China Star Entertainment Group films
Films about journalists
Films set in Hong Kong
Films shot in Hong Kong
2000s Hong Kong films